Stefano Albertoni (born 10 April 1966) is a retired Swiss-Italian football midfielder.

References

1966 births
Living people
Italian people of Swiss descent
Italian footballers
FC Sion players
FC Bulle players
Association football midfielders
Swiss Super League players